The superior cistern (cistern of great cerebral vein, quadrigeminal cistern, Bichat's canal) is a dilation as a subarachnoid cistern of the subarachnoid space around the brain. It lies between the splenium of the corpus callosum and the superior surface of the cerebellum. It extends between the layers of the tela choroidea of the third ventricle. It contains the great cerebral vein, posterior cerebral artery, quadrigeminal artery, glossopharyngeal nerve (CN IX), and the pineal gland.

Structure 
The superior cistern is a dilatation as a subarachnoid cistern of the subarachnoid space around the brain. It lies between the splenium of the corpus callosum (superiorly), the cerebellar vermis (inferiorly and posteriorly), and the tentorial margin. It lies medial to part of the medial occipital cortex. It extends between the layers of the tela choroidea of the third ventricle.

Contents 
The superior cistern contains a number of important structures, including:

 the great cerebral vein. This lies superiorly, and helps to form its superior wall.
 parts of the posterior cerebral artery.
 parts of the quadrigeminal artery.
 the exit of the glossopharyngeal nerve (CN IX).
 the pineal gland.

Clinical significance 
Arteriovenous malformations of the great cerebral vein can create an enlarged pouch of vein in the superior cistern. This is derived from the prosencephalic vein present during prenatal development. This can be diagnosed soon after birth. Medical ultrasound may be used, where it displaces the third ventricle. Angiography may also be used.

The superior cistern may be opened during neurosurgery. This is used in order to access deeper brain structures, such as the superior colliculus.

History 
The superior cistern may also be known as the cistern of great cerebral vein, the quadrigeminal cistern, and Bichat's canal.

References 

Meninges